James "Jimmy Nap" Napoli (November 4, 1911 – December 29, 1992) was a New York mobster who was a Caporegime in the Genovese crime family. From the 1950s to the 1980s, he controlled one of the largest illegal gambling operations in the United States.

Napoli enjoyed fine foods, good wines, and a life of luxury. Jimmy was known as a "Gentleman's Gentleman". Intelligent and well-respected, Napoli maintained ties to most of the major crime families. Napoli was married to Jeanne Napoli, a former night club singer and theatrical producer.  In 1984, Napoli invested $250,000 in an unsuccessful musical biography of actress Marilyn Monroe that starred Jeanne.

In 1969, Napoli was indicted for fixing several boxing matches. In the 1970s, Napoli reportedly operated the largest numbers operation in the United States. By 1976, the operation allegedly employed 2,000 people and grossed over $150 million a year. Napoli apparently ran this huge operation from a lounge in the Greenpoint section of Brooklyn. In 1978, Napoli was convicted for gambling and sentenced to five years in federal prison.

In July 1988, Napoli was indicted on murder conspiracy charges. He had been taped by Federal Bureau of Investigation (FBI) agents as he discussed the attempted murders of Gambino crime family boss John Gotti, Gene Gotti and mob associate Irwin Schiff. 

On December 29, 1992, Napoli died of natural causes in the Kips Bay section of Manhattan. He was buried in St. John Cemetery, Queens, New York.

References

1911 births
1992 deaths
American gangsters of Italian descent
Burials at St. John's Cemetery (Queens)
Genovese crime family